Siva I was King of Anuradhapura in the 1st century BC, who ruled in the year 47 BC. He succeeded Kuda Tissa as King of Anuradhapura and was succeeded by Vatuka.

Claim to the throne 
The Mahavamsa states that queen Anula, Kudatissa's queen consort, fell in love with Siva, who was then a royal palace guard, and poisoned Kuda Tissa to let Siva claim the throne of Anuradhapura.

See also
 List of Sri Lankan monarchs
 History of Sri Lanka
 Anuradhapura period

References

External links
 Kings & Rulers of Sri Lanka
 Codrington's Short History of Ceylon

Monarchs of Anuradhapura
Sinhalese kings
S
S